The 1991 Superbike World Championship was the fourth FIM Superbike World Championship season. The season started on 1 April at Donington Park and finished on 19 October at Phillip Island after 13 rounds.

Doug Polen won the riders' championship with 17 victories and Ducati won the manufacturers' championship.

The third round of the championship at Mosport was boycotted by the regular riders on safety grounds.

Championship standings
In each race, points were awarded as follows:

Riders' standings

Manufacturers' standings

References

External links

Superbike racing
Superbike World Championship seasons